Grasmere is a suburb in the New Zealand city of Invercargill.

The area is low-lying and at risk from flooding and sea level rise.

In 1984, Waihopai River burst its banks, causing flooding Grasmere and other suburbs. Homes and properties were damaged, and some people became homeless or lost their jobs. Flood banks were installed to prevent further floods.

Grasmere School opened , was merged with Waikiwi and West Plains schools in 2005 and closed in 2009. The school site was sold to private owners in 2007, Invercargill City Council gave planning approval for the site to be subdivided in 2008, and the site was auctioned off in two parts in 2009.

Between 2017 and 2018, Grasmere was the only suburb in Invercargill where the median house price declined.

Demographics

Prestonville-Grasmere had a population of 3,720 at the 2018 New Zealand census, an increase of 207 people (5.9%) since the 2013 census, and an increase of 267 people (7.7%) since the 2006 census. There were 1,413 households. There were 1,791 males and 1,929 females, giving a sex ratio of 0.93 males per female. The median age was 36.3 years (compared with 37.4 years nationally), with 792 people (21.3%) aged under 15 years, 690 (18.5%) aged 15 to 29, 1,530 (41.1%) aged 30 to 64, and 711 (19.1%) aged 65 or older.

Ethnicities were 90.2% European/Pākehā, 15.2% Māori, 2.1% Pacific peoples, 3.7% Asian, and 1.9% other ethnicities (totals add to more than 100% since people could identify with multiple ethnicities).

The proportion of people born overseas was 8.6%, compared with 27.1% nationally.

Although some people objected to giving their religion, 58.4% had no religion, 33.5% were Christian, 0.1% were Hindu, 0.2% were Muslim, 0.2% were Buddhist and 2.2% had other religions.

Of those at least 15 years old, 330 (11.3%) people had a bachelor or higher degree, and 855 (29.2%) people had no formal qualifications. The median income was $31,400, compared with $31,800 nationally. 336 people (11.5%) earned over $70,000 compared to 17.2% nationally. The employment status of those at least 15 was that 1,512 (51.6%) people were employed full-time, 408 (13.9%) were part-time, and 96 (3.3%) were unemployed.

References

Suburbs of Invercargill